The Nikon Coolpix P610 is a superzoom bridge camera announced by Nikon on February 10, 2015.

It differs from its predecessor, the Nikon Coolpix P600, with the inclusion of a sensor to automatically switch between monitor mode and the electronic viewfinder, a timelapse mode, and full HD video at 60 frames per second progressive (60p as opposed to 60i; i.e. as considered better than the P600's 60 frame maximum being interlaced video.)

It has built in GPS with GLONASS, that can be selected to write to each image's Exif data.

References
http://www.dpreview.com/products/nikon/compacts/nikon_cpp610/specifications

P610
Superzoom cameras
Cameras introduced in 2015